Emma Dunn (26 February 1875 – 14 December 1966) was an English actress. After starting her acting career on stage in London, she became known for her works in numerous films and Broadway productions.

Career

Emma Dunn appeared onstage in her early teens, graduating to the London stage for several years and later became a noted Broadway actress. She appeared in the first American production of Ibsen's Peer Gynt (1906) with Richard Mansfield as Peer. She played Peer's mother, Ase, even though she was, in real life, 20 years younger than Mansfield. She appeared in three productions for theatre impresario David Belasco: The Warrens of Virginia (1907), The Easiest Way (1909) and The Governor's Lady (1912). In The Easiest Way, Dunn portrayed Annie, who was black, in blackface. In 1913 Dunn appeared in vaudeville.

Dunn made her first film in 1914, a silent film of her 1910 stage success, Mother, directed by Maurice Tourneur. This was Tourneur's first American film. Dunn's second film was 1920's Old Lady 31, reprising the role she played in the 1916 Broadway play of the same name. One more silent film followed in 1924, Pied Piper Malone, and then she made her sound debut in Side Street, co-starring the Moore brothers, Matt, Owen and Tom as her sons.

Dunn wrote two books on elocution and speech: Thought Quality in the Voice (1933) and You Can Do It (1947).

Personal life

Emma Dunn was born 26 February 1875, in Birkenhead, England, although she sometimes gave her year of birth as 1883.

Dunn married Harry Beresford, an actor who was then known professionally as Harry J. Morgan, in Chicago on 4 October 1897. They divorced on 10 February 1909, in New York City. She was awarded sole custody of their young daughter, Dorothy. On 19 May 1909, Dunn married John W. Stokes (John W. S. Sullivan), an actor, playwright and theatrical manager. They subsequently adopted a second daughter, Helen. The couple divorced sometime between 1923 and Stokes' death in 1931.

After suffering a heart attack some months before, Dunn died 14 December 1966 in Los Angeles, California, aged 91.

Theatre credits

Filmography

References

External links

Emma Dunn (Aveleyman)

1875 births
1966 deaths
English expatriates in the United States
English film actresses
English silent film actresses
English stage actresses
English non-fiction writers
People from Birkenhead
20th-century English actresses
British expatriate actresses in the United States